Kuala Tatau is a village in Tatau District, Bintulu Division in the Malaysian state of Sarawak.

Transport

Local bus

Bus Express

References 

Villages in Sarawak
Populated places in Sarawak